Route nationale 3b (RN 3b) is a secondary highway in Madagascar of 106 km, running from Sambava to Andapa. It crosses the region of Sava.

Selected locations on route
(west to east)
Andapa 
Tanambo
Ambatobarika
Sambava (intersection with RN 5a to Ambilobe and Antalaha)

See also
List of roads in Madagascar
Transport in Madagascar

References

Roads in Sava
Roads in Madagascar